Owls Head is a hamlet in Franklin County, New York, United States. Owls Head has a post office with ZIP code 12969, which opened on August 24, 1892.

References

 Hamlets in Franklin County, New York
 Hamlets in New York (state)